Pennewitz is a village and a former municipality in the district Ilm-Kreis, in Thuringia, Germany. Since July 2018, it is part of the town Ilmenau.

References

Ilm-Kreis
Former municipalities in Thuringia